Denise Cocquerillat (08 June 1918, Granville - 18 December 1999, Paris) was a French archaeologist and Assyriologist, specialist in cuneiform texts.

Biography
She studied at the École du Louvre and passed a thesis (“The Mace in Mesopotamian Iconography”) on 22 December 1947 with Georges Contenau and André Parrot as members of the jury.

She also studied ancient languages, such as Hebrew, Assyrian-Babylonian and Sumerian.  She then devoted herself to the translation of cuneiform texts and became director of research at the French National Centre for Scientific Research.

Denise Cocquerillat has dealt with about 10% of the 1500 published Neo-Babylonian tablets from Uruk  and the legal texts of Babylon dating from the second millennium BC.

Works

References

1918 births
1999 deaths
20th-century French women
French Assyriologists
People from Manche
French women archaeologists